was a Japanese football player and manager. He played for Japan national team.

Club career
Onishi was born in Kyoto on April 18, 1943. After graduating from Kyoto University of Education, he joined Mitsubishi Motors in 1967. The club won the league champions in 1969 and 1973. The club also won 1971 and 1973 Emperor's Cup. He retired in 1974. He played 83 games in the league.

National team career
In October 1969, Onishi was selected Japan national team for 1970 World Cup qualification. At this qualification, on October 10, he debuted against Australia.

Coaching career
After retirement, Onishi became a manager for Toshiba in 1981. He managed until 1985–86 season. In 2002, he signed with Thespa Kusatsu and became a general manager. From November 2005, he also served as president.

On June 29, 2006, Onishi died of lung cancer in Yokohama at the age of 63.

Club statistics

National team statistics

References

External links
 
 Japan National Football Team Database

1943 births
2006 deaths
Kyoto University of Education alumni
Association football people from Kyoto Prefecture
Japanese footballers
Japan international footballers
Japan Soccer League players
Urawa Red Diamonds players
Japanese football managers
Association football defenders